Virginia Ruano Pascual and Paola Suárez were the defending champions but lost in the final 5–7, 7–6(7–5), 6–3 against Lisa Raymond and Rennae Stubbs.

Seeds
Champion seeds are indicated in bold text while text in italics indicates the round in which those seeds were eliminated. The top four seeded teams received byes into the second round.

Draw

Final

Top half

Bottom half

External links
 2001 Family Circle Cup draw

Charleston Open
2001 WTA Tour
Family Circle